David Francis Raine was a St. George's town councillor, historian and former teacher who authored thirteen books and numerous articles, particularly on the subject of the history of Bermuda.

Books

Non-fiction 
1980: Pitseolak: A Canadian Tragedy. ISBN 9789997571830
1971: The Historic Towne of St. George Bermuda. ASIN B0007ANC4Y 
1984: Sir George Somers: A Man and his Times. ISBN 9780921962106
1986: Bermuda As It Used To Be.  ASIN B000GP3QB4
1992: Rattle and Shake: The Story of the Bermuda Railway. ISBN 9780921962113
1994: The Imprisoned Splendour: The Life and Work of Sam Morse-Brown. 9780921962090
1996: Architecture: Bermuda Style.  ASIN B0007JD182 
1997: Solved!: The Greatest Sea Mystery of All. ISBN 9780921962151.
2005: The Magic of Bermuda.  ISBN 9781843309390

References

1948 births
2004 deaths
Bermudian writers
Bermudian businesspeople
Bermudian historians
Bermudian educators
Bermudian politicians